The Indigenous languages of Australia number in the hundreds, the precise number being quite uncertain, although there is a range of estimates from a minimum of around 250 (using the technical definition of 'language' as non-mutually intelligible varieties) up to possibly 363. The Indigenous languages of Australia comprise numerous language families and isolates, perhaps as many as 13, spoken by the Indigenous peoples of mainland Australia and a few nearby islands. The relationships between the language families are not clear at present although there are proposals to link some into larger groupings. Despite this uncertainty, the Indigenous Australian languages are collectively covered by the technical term "Australian languages", or the "Australian family".

The term can include both Tasmanian languages and the Western Torres Strait language, but the genetic relationship to the mainland Australian languages of the former is unknown, while the latter is Pama–Nyungan, though it shares features with the neighbouring Papuan, Eastern Trans-Fly languages, in particular Meriam Mir of the Torres Strait Islands, as well as the Papuan Tip Austronesian languages. Most Australian languages belong to the widespread Pama–Nyungan family, while the remainder are classified as "non-Pama–Nyungan", which is a term of convenience that does not imply a genealogical relationship.

In the late 18th century there were more than 250 distinct First Nations Peoples social groupings and a similar number of languages or varieties. The status and knowledge of Aboriginal languages today varies greatly. Many languages became extinct with settlement as the encroachment of colonial society broke up Indigenous cultures. For some of these languages, few records exist for vocabulary and grammar. At the start of the 21st century, fewer than 150 Aboriginal languages remain in daily use, with the majority being highly endangered.  In 2020, 90 per cent of the barely more than 100 languages still spoken are considered endangered. 13 languages are still being transmitted to children. The surviving languages are located in the most isolated areas. Of the five least endangered Western Australian Aboriginal languages, four belong to the Western Desert grouping of the Central and Great Victoria Desert.

Yolŋu languages from north-east Arnhem Land are also currently learned by children. Bilingual education is being used successfully in some communities. Seven of the most widely spoken Australian languages, such as Warlpiri, Murrinh-patha and Tiwi, retain between 1,000 and 3,000 speakers. Some Indigenous communities and linguists show support for learning programmes either for language revival proper or for only "post-vernacular maintenance" (Indigenous communities having the opportunity to learn some words and concepts related to the lost language).

Living Aboriginal languages
The National Indigenous Languages Survey is a regular Australia-wide survey of the status of Aboriginal and Torres Strait Islander languages conducted in 2005, 2014 and 2019.

Languages with more than 100 speakers:
 New South Wales:
 3 languages (~ 600):
Yugambeh-Bundjalung
Bundjalung (~ 100)
Yugambeh (~ 20; shared with Queensland)
Githabul (~ 10; shared with Queensland)
Wiradjuri (~ 500)
Gamilaraay (~ 100)
 South Australia:
 4 languages (~ 3,900):
 Ngarrindjeri (~ 300)
 Adyamathanha (~ 100)
 Yankunytjatjara (~ 400)
 Pitjantjatjara (~ 3,100; shared with Northern Territory and Western Australia)
 Queensland:
 5 languages (~ 1,800):
Kuku Yalanji (~ 300)
 Guugu Yimidhirr (~ 800)
 Kuuk Thaayore (~ 300)
 Wik Mungkan (~ 400)
 Western Australia:
 17 languages (~ 8,000):
 Noongar (~ 500)
 Wangkatha (~ 300)
 Ngaanyatjarra (~ 1,000)
 Manytjilyitjarra (~ 100)
 Martu Wangka (~ 700)
 Panyjima (~ 100)
 Yinjibarndi (~ 400)
 Nyangumarta (~ 200)
 Bardi (~ 400)
 Wajarri (~ 100)
 Pintupi (~ 100; shared with Northern Territory)
 Pitjantjatjara (~3,100; shared with Northern Territory and South Australia)
 Kukatja (~ 100)
 Walmatjarri (~ 300)
 Gooniyandi (~ 100)
 Djaru (~ 200)
 Kija (~ 200)
 Miriwoong (~ 200)
 Northern Territory:
 19 languages (~ 28,100):
 Luritja (~ 1,000)
 Upper Arrernte (~ 4,500)
 Warlpiri (~ 2,300)
 Kaytetye (~ 100)
 Warumungu (~ 300)
 Gurindji (~ 400)
 Murrinh Patha (~ 2,000)
 Tiwi (~ 2,000)
 Pintupi (~ 100; shared with Western Australia)
 Pitjantjatjara (~3,100; shared with Western Australia and South Australia)
 Iwaidja (~ 100)
 Maung (~ 400)
 Kunwinjku (~ 1,800)
 Burarra (~ 1,000)
 Dhuwal (~4,200)
 Djinang (~ 100)
 Nunggubuyu (~ 300)
 Anindilyakwa (~ 1,500)

Total 46 languages, 42,300 speakers, with 11 having only approximately 100. 11 languages have over 1,000 speakers.
 Creoles:
 Kriol (~ 20,000)

Classification

Internal
Most Australian languages are commonly held to belong to the Pama–Nyungan family, a family accepted by most linguists, with Robert M. W. Dixon as a notable exception. For convenience, the rest of the languages, all spoken in the far north, are commonly lumped together as "Non-Pama–Nyungan", although this does not necessarily imply that they constitute a valid clade. Dixon argues that after perhaps 40,000 years of mutual influence, it is no longer possible to distinguish deep genealogical relationships from areal features in Australia, and that not even Pama–Nyungan is a valid language family.

However, few other linguists accept Dixon's thesis. For example, Kenneth L. Hale describes Dixon's skepticism as an erroneous phylogenetic assessment which is "such an insult to the eminently successful practitioners of Comparative Method Linguistics in Australia, that it positively demands a decisive riposte".

Johanna Nichols suggests that the northern families may be relatively recent arrivals from Maritime Southeast Asia, perhaps later replaced there by the spread of Austronesian. That could explain the typological difference between Pama–Nyungan and non-Pama–Nyungan languages, but not how a single family came to be so widespread. Nicholas Evans suggests that the Pama–Nyungan family spread along with the now-dominant Aboriginal culture that includes the Australian Aboriginal kinship system.

In late 2017, Mark Harvey and Robert Mailhammer published a study in Diachronica that hypothesised, by analysing noun class prefix paradigms across both Pama-Nyungan and the minority non-Pama-Nyungan languages, that a Proto-Australian could be reconstructed from which all known Australian languages descend. This Proto-Australian language, they concluded, would have been spoken about 12,000 years ago in northern Australia.

External
For a long time unsuccessful attempts were made to detect a link between Australian and Papuan languages, the latter being represented by those spoken on the coastal areas of New Guinea facing the Torres Strait and the Arafura Sea. In 1986 William A. Foley noted lexical similarities between Robert M. W. Dixon's 1980 reconstruction of proto-Australian and the East New Guinea Highlands languages. He believed that it was naïve to expect to find a single Papuan or Australian language family when New Guinea and Australia had been a single landmass (called the Sahul continent) for most of their human history, having been separated by the Torres Strait only 8000 years ago, and that a deep reconstruction would likely include languages from both. Dixon, in the meantime, later abandoned his proto-Australian proposal.

Families

Glottolog 4.1 (2019)
Glottolog 4.1 (2019) recognizes 23 independent families and 9 isolates in Australia, comprising a total of 32 independent language groups.

Families (23)

Pama-Nyungan (248)
Gunwinyguan (12)
Western Daly (11)
Nyulnyulan (10)
Worrorran (10)
Mirndi (5)
Iwaidjan Proper (4)
Mangarrayi-Maran (4)
Maningrida (4)
Tangkic (4)
Giimbiyu (3)
Jarrakan (3)
Yangmanic (3)
Bunaban (2)
Eastern Daly (2)
Northern Daly (2)
Southern Daly (2)
Garrwan (2)
Limilngan-Wulna (2)
Marrku-Wurrugu (2)
North-Eastern Tasmanian (2)
South-Eastern Tasmanian (2)
Western Tasmanian (2)

Isolates (9)

Gaagudju (extinct)
Kungarakany
Laragia
Minkin (extinct)
Oyster Bay-Big River-Little Swanport
Tiwi
Umbugarla
Wadjiginy
Wageman

Bowern (2011)
According to Claire Bowern's Australian Languages (2011), Australian languages divide into approximately 30 primary sub-groups and 5 isolates.

 Presumptive isolates:
 Tiwi
 Giimbiyu (extinct)
 Marrgu (extinct)
 Wagiman (moribund)
 Wardaman
 Previously established families:
 Bunuban (2)
 Daly (four to five families, with 11–19 languages)
 Iwaidjan (3–7)
 Jarrakan (3–5)
 Nyulnyulan (8)
 Worrorran (7–12)
 Newly proposed families:
 Mirndi (5–7)
 Darwin Region (4)
 Macro-Gunwinyguan languages (22)
 Greater Pama–Nyungan:
 Tangkic (5)
 Garawan (3)
 Pama–Nyungan proper (approximately 270 languages)
 Western and Northern Tasmanian (extinct)
 Northeastern Tasmanian (extinct)
 Eastern Tasmanian (extinct)

Survival
It has been inferred from the probable number of languages and the estimate of pre-contact population levels that there may have been from 3,000 to 4,000 speakers on average for each of the 250 languages. A number of these languages were almost immediately wiped out within decades of colonisation, the case of the Aboriginal Tasmanians being one notorious example of precipitous linguistic ethnocide. Tasmania had been separated from the mainland at the end of the Quaternary glaciation, and Indigenous Tasmanians remained isolated from the outside world for around 12,000 years. Claire Bowern has concluded in a recent study that there were twelve Tasmanian languages, and that those languages are unrelated (that is, not demonstrably related) to those on the Australian mainland.

In 1990 it was estimated that 90 languages still survived of the approximately 250 once spoken, but with a high rate of attrition as elders died out. Of the 90, 70% by 2001 were judged as 'severely endangered' with only 17 spoken by all age groups, a definition of a 'strong' language. On these grounds it is anticipated that despite efforts at linguistic preservation, many of the remaining languages will disappear within the next generation. The overall trend suggests that in the not too distant future all of the Indigenous languages will be lost, perhaps by 2050, and with them the cultural knowledge they convey.

During the period of the Stolen Generations, Aboriginal children were removed from their families and placed in institutions where they were punished for speaking their Indigenous language. Different, mutually unintelligible language groups were often mixed together, with Australian Aboriginal English or Australian Kriol language as the only lingua franca. The result was a disruption to the inter-generational transmission of these languages that severely impacted their future use. Today, that same transmission of language between parents and grandparents to their children is a key mechanism for reversing language shift. For children, proficiency in the language of their cultural heritage has a positive influence on their ethnic identity formation, and it is thought to be of particular benefit to the emotional well-being of Indigenous children. There is some evidence to suggest that the reversal of the Indigenous language shift may lead to decreased self-harm and suicide rates among Indigenous youth.

The first Aboriginal people to use Australian Aboriginal languages in the Australian parliament were Aden Ridgeway on 25 August 1999 in the Senate when he said "On this special occasion, I make my presence known as an Aborigine and to this chamber I say, perhaps for the first time: " and in the House of Representatives on 31 August 2016 Linda Burney gave an acknowledgment of country in Wiradjuri in her first speech and was sung in by Lynette Riley in Wiradjuri from the public gallery.

Preservation measures
2019 was the International Year of Indigenous Languages (IYIL2019), as declared by the United Nations General Assembly. The commemoration was used to raise awareness of and support for the preservation of Aboriginal languages within Australia, including spreading knowledge about the importance of each language to the identity and knowledge of Indigenous groups. Warrgamay/Girramay man Troy Wyles-Whelan joined the North Queensland Regional Aboriginal Corporation Language Centre (NQRACLC) in 2008, and has been contributing oral histories and the results of his own research to their database. As part of the efforts to raise awareness of Wiradjuri language a Grammar of Wiradjuri language was published in 2014 and A new Wiradjuri dictionary in 2010.

The New South Wales Aboriginal Languages Act 2017 became law on 24 October 2017. It was the first legislation in Australia to acknowledge the significance of first languages.

In 2019 the Royal Australian Mint issued a 50-cent coin to celebrate the International Year of Indigenous Languages which features 14 different words for "money" from Australian Indigenous languages. The coin was designed by Aleksandra Stokic in consultation with Indigenous language custodian groups.

The work of digitising and transcribing many word lists created by ethnographer Daisy Bates in the 1900s at Daisy Bates Online provides a valuable resource for those researching especially Western Australian languages, and some languages of the Northern Territory and South Australia. The project is co-ordinated by  Nick Thieberger, who works in collaboration with the National Library of Australia "to have all the microfilmed images from Section XII of the Bates papers digitised".  The project is succeeded by the Nyingarn Project
, which digitises manuscripts and crowdsources transcriptions through DigiVol.

Language revival
In recent decades, there have been attempts to revive indigenous languages. Significant challenges exist, however, for the revival of languages in the dominant English language culture of Australia.

The Kaurna language, spoken by the Kaurna people of the Adelaide plains, has been the subject of a concerted revival movement since the 1980s, coordinated by Kaurna Warra Pintyanthi, a unit working out of the University of Adelaide. The language had rapidly disappeared after the settlement of South Australia and the breaking up of local indigenous people. Ivaritji, the last known speaker of the language, died in 1931. However, a substantial number of primary source records existed for the language, from which the language was reconstructed.

Common features

"Some Aboriginal people distinguish between usership and ownership. There are even those who claim that they own a language although they only know one single word of it: its name."

Whether it is due to genetic unity or some other factor such as occasional contact, typologically the Australian languages form a language area or Sprachbund, sharing much of their vocabulary and many distinctive phonological features across the entire continent.

A common feature of many Australian languages is that they display so-called avoidance speech, special speech registers used only in the presence of certain close relatives. These registers share the phonology and grammar of the standard language, but the lexicon is different and usually very restricted. There are also commonly speech taboos during extended periods of mourning or initiation that have led to numerous Aboriginal sign languages.

For morphosyntactic alignment, many Australian languages have ergative–absolutive case systems. These are typically split systems; a widespread pattern is for pronouns (or first and second persons) to have nominative–accusative case marking and for third person to be ergative–absolutive, though splits between animate and inanimate are also found. In some languages the persons in between the accusative and ergative inflections (such as second person, or third-person human) may be tripartite: that is, marked overtly as either ergative or accusative in transitive clauses, but not marked as either in intransitive clauses. There are also a few languages which employ only nominative–accusative case marking.

Phonetics and phonology
The following represents a canonical 6-place Australian Aboriginal consonant system. It does not represent any single language, but is instead a simplified form of the consonant inventory of what would be found in many Australian languages, including most Arandic and Yolŋu languages.

Segmental inventory
A typical Australian phonological inventory includes just three vowels, usually , which may occur in both long and short variants. In a few cases the  has been unrounded to give .

In the few cases where fricatives do occur, they developed recently through the lenition (weakening) of stops, and are therefore non-sibilants like  rather than the sibilants like  that are common elsewhere in the world. Some languages also have three rhotics, typically a flap, a trill, and an approximant (that is, like the combined rhotics of English and Spanish) and many have four laterals.

Besides the lack of fricatives, the most striking feature of Australian speech sounds is the large number of places of articulation. Some 10-15% of Australian languages have four places of articulation, with two coronal places of articulation, 40-50% have five places, and 40-45% have six places of articulation, including four coronals. In contrast, the overwhelming majority of languages worldwide have only one coronal place of articulation. The four-way distinction in the coronal region is commonly accomplished through two variables: the position of the tongue (front, alveolar or dental, or retroflex), and its shape (apical or laminal).
There are also bilabial, velar and often palatal consonants, but a complete absence of uvular consonants and only a few languages with a glottal stop. Both stops and nasals occur at all six places, and in many languages laterals occur at all four coronal places.

 speculates that the unusual segmental inventories of Australian languages may be due to the very high presence of otitis media ear infections and resulting hearing loss in their populations. People with hearing loss often have trouble distinguishing different vowels and hearing fricatives and voicing contrasts. Australian Aboriginal languages thus seem to show similarities to the speech of people with hearing loss, and avoid those sounds and distinctions which are difficult for people with early childhood hearing loss to perceive. At the same time, Australian languages make full use of those distinctions, namely place of articulation distinctions, which people with otitis media-caused hearing loss can perceive more easily. This hypothesis has been challenged on historical, comparative, statistical, and medical grounds.

A language which displays the full range of stops, nasals and laterals is Kalkatungu, which has labial p, m; "dental" th, nh, lh; "alveolar" t, n, l; "retroflex" rt, rn, rl; "palatal" ty, ny, ly; and velar k, ng. Wangganguru has all this, as well as three rhotics. Yanyuwa has even more contrasts, with an additional true dorso-palatal series, plus prenasalised consonants at all seven places of articulation, in addition to all four laterals.

Where vowels are concerned, it has 8 vowels with some morpho-syntactic as well as phonemic length contrasts, and glides that distinguish between those that are in origin vowels, and those that in origin are consonants. Kunjen and other neighbouring languages have also developed contrasting aspirated consonants not found further south.

Coronal consonants
Descriptions of the coronal articulations can be inconsistent.

The alveolar series t, n, l (or d, n, l) is straightforward: across the continent, these sounds are alveolar (that is, pronounced by touching the tongue to the ridge just behind the gum line of the upper teeth) and apical (that is, touching that ridge with the tip of the tongue). This is very similar to English t, d, n, l, though the Australian t is not aspirated, even in Kalaw Lagaw Ya, despite its other stops being aspirated.

The other apical series is the retroflex, rt, rn, rl (or rd, rn, rl). Here the place is further back in the mouth, in the postalveolar or prepalatal region. The articulation is actually most commonly subapical; that is, the tongue curls back so that the underside of the tip makes contact. That is, they are true retroflex consonants. It has been suggested that subapical pronunciation is characteristic of more careful speech, while these sounds tend to be apical in rapid speech. Kalaw Lagaw Ya and many other languages in North Queensland differ from most other Australian languages in not having a retroflexive series.

The dental series th, nh, lh are always laminal (that is, pronounced by touching with the surface of the tongue just above the tip, called the blade of the tongue), but may be formed in one of three different ways, depending on the language, on the speaker, and on how carefully the speaker pronounces the sound. These are interdental with the tip of the tongue visible between the teeth, as in th in English; dental with the tip of the tongue down behind the lower teeth, so that the blade is visible between the teeth; and denti-alveolar, that is, with both the tip and the blade making contact with the back of the upper teeth and alveolar ridge, as in French t, d, n, l. The first tends to be used in careful enunciation, and the last in more rapid speech, while the tongue-down articulation is less common.

Finally, the palatal series ty, ny, ly. (The stop is often spelled dj, tj, or j.) Here the contact is also laminal, but further back, spanning the alveolar to postalveolar, or the postalveolar to prepalatal regions. The tip of the tongue is typically down behind the lower teeth. This is similar to the "closed" articulation of Circassian fricatives (see Postalveolar consonant). The body of the tongue is raised towards the palate. This is similar to the "domed" English postalveolar fricative sh. Because the tongue is "peeled" from the roof of the mouth from back to front during the release of these stops, there is a fair amount of frication, giving the ty something of the impression of the English palato-alveolar affricate ch or the Polish alveolo-palatal affricate ć. That is, these consonants are not palatal in the IPA sense of the term, and indeed they contrast with true palatals in Yanyuwa.

These descriptions do not apply exactly to all Australian languages, as the notes regarding Kalaw Lagaw Ya demonstrate. However, they do describe most of them, and are the expected norm against which languages are compared.

Phonotactics
Some have suggested that the most appropriate unit to describe the phonotactics of Australian languages is the phonological word. The most common word length is two syllables, and a typical phonological word would have the form:

(C)VC(C)V(C)

with the first syllable being stressed. The optionality of C is cross-linguistically normal, since coda consonants are weak or nonexistent in many languages, as well as in the early stages of language acquisition. The weakening of C, on the other hand, is very unusual. No Australian language has consonant clusters in this position, and those languages with fortis and lenis distinctions do not make such distinctions in this position. Place of articulation distinctions are also less common in this position, and lenitions and deletions are historically common here. While in most languages the word-initial position is prominent, maintaining all a language's contrasts, that is not the case in Australia. Here the prominent position is C(C), in the middle of the word. C is typically the only position allowing all of a language's place of articulation contrasts. Fortis/lenis contrasts can only occur at C, or at C when C is a sonorant. Consonant clusters are often restricted to the C(C) position, and are most commonly sonorant + obstruent sequences. In languages with pre-stopped nasals or laterals, those sounds only occur at C.

Australian languages typically resist certain connected speech processes which might blur the place of articulation of consonants at C(C), such as anticipatory assimilation of place of articulation, which is common around the world. In Australia, this type of assimilation seems only to have affected consonants within the apical and laminal categories. There's little evidence of assimilation between the labial, apical, laminal, and dorsal categories. Many proto-Pama–Nyungan  and  clusters have been preserved across Australia. Heterorganic nasal + stop sequences remain stable even in modern connected speech, which is highly unusual.

The anticipatory assimilation of nasality is quite common in various languages around the world. Typically, a vowel will become nasalized before a following nasal consonant. However, this process is resisted in Australian languages.
There was a historical process in many languages where nasal + stop CC clusters lost the nasal element if C was a nasal. Also, many languages have morphophonemic alterations whereby initial nasals in suffixes are denasalized if the preceding stem contains a nasal consonant.
While the existence of phonemic pre-stopped nasals and laterals, contrasting with plain nasals and laterals, has been documented in some Australian languages, nasals and laterals are pre-stopped on a phonetic level in most languages of the continent. These phenomena are the result of a general resistance to the anticipatory assimilation of nasality and laterality. The lack of assimilation makes coda nasals and laterals more acoustically distinct.

Most speakers of Australian languages speak with a 'pressed' voice quality, with the glottal opening narrower than in modal voice, a relatively high frequency of creaky voice, and low airflow. This may be due to an avoidance of breathy voice. This pressed quality could therefore serve to enhance the clarity of speech and ensure the perception of place of articulation distinctions.

The weakness of initial consonants in Australian Aboriginal languages is characteristic of hearing-impaired speech, and has been speculated to be the result of high rates of Otitis media-caused hearing loss in Aboriginal communities. Other characteristics of Australian Aboriginal languages' phonotactics, such as their avoidance of assimilation and the pressed voice quality, may be due to the result of strategies to fully exploit all the restricted auditory space caused by hearing loss and to preserve all of the place distinctions.

Orthography

Probably every Australian language with speakers remaining has had an orthography developed for it, in each case in the Latin script. Sounds not found in English are usually represented by digraphs, or more rarely by diacritics, such as underlines, or extra symbols, sometimes borrowed from the International Phonetic Alphabet. Some examples are shown in the following table.

Demographics (2016)
In the Northern Territory, 62.5% of Aboriginal Australians spoke an indigenous language at home in 2016. In Queensland, almost 95% of Torres Strait Islanders spoke an indigenous language at home in 2016.

Notable linguists
A number of linguists and ethnographers have contributed greatly to the sum of knowledge about Australian languages. Of particular note are:

Barry Blake
Claire Bowern
Gavan Breen
Arthur Capell
R. M. W. Dixon
Kenneth Hale
Margaret Heffernan
Luise Hercus
David Nash
Lynette Oates (1921–2013)
Nicholas Evans
Rachel Nordlinger

See also

 Aboriginal Australians
 Australian Aboriginal sign languages
 List of Aboriginal Australian group names
 List of Australian Aboriginal languages
 List of Aboriginal languages of New South Wales
 List of Australian place names of Aboriginal origin
 List of endangered languages with mobile apps
 List of reduplicated Australian place names
 Living Archive of Aboriginal Languages
 Macro-Gunwinyguan languages
 Macro-Pama–Nyungan languages

Notes

Citations

Sources

 Bowern, C. 2011. Oxford Bibliographies Online: Australian Languages 

 

 *

 McConvell, Patrick & Claire Bowern. 2011. The prehistory and internal relationships of Australian languages. Language and Linguistics Compass 5(1). 19–32.

Further reading

 AUSTLANG Australian Indigenous Languages Database at AIATSIS
 Aboriginal Australia map, a guide to Aboriginal language, tribal and nation groups published by AIATSIS
 Aboriginal Languages of Australia
 The AIATSIS map of Aboriginal Australia (recorded ranges; full view here
 Languages of Australia, as listed by Ethnologue
 Report of the Second National Indigenous Languages Survey 2014 
 Finding the meaning of an Aboriginal word
 Aboriginal and Torres Strait Islander Social Justice Commissioner, Social Justice Report 2009 for more information about Aboriginal and Torres Strait Islander languages and policy.
 Living Archive of Aboriginal Languages (Northern Territory languages only)
 Bowern, Claire. 2016. "Chirila: Contemporary and Historical Resources for the Indigenous Languages of Australia". Language Documentation and Conservation 10 (2016): 1–44. http://nflrc.hawaii.edu/ldc/?p=1002.

External links
CHIRILA: A database of the languages of Australia  (Contemporary and Historical Reconstruction in the Indigenous Languages of Australia)
CHIRILA, Yale Pama-Nyungan Lab

Gambay - First Languages Map, an interactive map of Aboriginal and Torres Strait Islander languages
Aboriginal and Torres Strait Islander word lists, State Library of Queensland. 
Spoken: celebrating Queensland languages digital stories, State Library of Queensland